Jamie Bender (born February 26, 1990) is an American football defensive back for the Richmond Roughriders of the American Arena League (AAL). He played college football at University of Alabama at Birmingham and attended Raleigh High School in Raleigh, Mississippi. He has also been a member of the Green Bay Blizzard, Nebraska Danger, Cleveland Gladiators and Iowa Barnstormers.

Early life
Bender attended Raleigh High School.

College career
Bender played for the Jones County Junior College Bobcats from 2008 to 2009 and the UAB Blazers from 2010 to 2011.

Professional career

Iowa Barnstormers
On October 25, 2016, Bender signed with the Iowa Barnstormers. Bender was named Second Team All-Indoor Football League at the conclusion of the regular season.

Richmond Roughriders
Bnder signed with the Richmond Roughriders in January 2018.

References

External links
 UAB Blazers bio

Living people
1990 births
Players of American football from Mississippi
People from Laurel, Mississippi
American football defensive backs
Jones County Bobcats football players
UAB Blazers football players
Green Bay Blizzard players
Cleveland Gladiators players
Nebraska Danger players
Iowa Barnstormers players
American Arena League players